The Battle of Sidi Brahim was a battle at Sidi Brahim in French Algeria between the troops of Abdelkader El Djezairi and French troops under Lieutenant-Colonel Lucien de Montagnac from 22 to 25 September 1845. The French force was made up of the light infantry troops of the 8th Infantry Battalion and the second squadron of the 2nd Regiment of Hussars.

Battle
The encounter was unplanned and poorly commanded by Montagnac, and went badly for the French troops. After a first encounter, the French's numbers were reduced from 450 to 82 chasseurs and hussars against hundreds of Algerians (Abd-el-Qader's never massed more than ca. 500 horsemen for pitched battle). Cornered, the chasseurs of the carabinier company took refuge in a marabout, from which they repulsed all assaults. After a siege lasting many days, without food or water and short of munitions, they were reduced to cutting up their musket balls in order to keep firing. Emir Abdelkader captured captain adjutant major Dutertre and taken under guard to the front of the marabout to demand the chasseurs' surrender, but instead used his time there to exhort the survivors to fight to the death, for which Abdelkader beheaded him. Abdelkader then demanded that the French bugler (Guillaume Rolland) sound the retreat, but he instead sounded the charge, whilst one chasseur replied to another of Abdelkader's other demands for their surrender with the word, Merde! (Shit). (in reference to Cambronne's answer at Waterloo). When the remaining 80 survivors completely ran out of munitions, they managed to break through the enemy lines with a bayonet charge, but only 16 of them managed to rejoin the French lines (5 of which died some days later). Among the dead was Montagnac himself. The remains of the soldiers killed at Sidi Brahim were gathered at Djemmaa Ghazaouet in the "Tombeau des Braves" then reburied at the Musée des Chasseurs at the old fort in Vincennes in 1965.

Legacy

The extreme bravery shown by the battalion led to its being nicknamed the battalion of Sidi-Brahim and the battle being written up among its battle honours. However, according to Gilles Manceron, the soldiers "were led in quite an inconsiderate manner" by Colonel de Montagnac "whose writings boast, with no remorse, of several war crimes". The expression "faire Sidi Brahim" became a motto of the Chasseurs (light infantry / mountain battalions). During the First World War, the 7th Battalion of Chasseurs Alpins (7°BCA) took a German pass for several days and, lacking munitions, managed to repulse the German attack with stones. There the chasseurs won the nickname "schwarzen Teufel" (black devils), which later became "Blue Devils" (les Diables bleus), which they still use. The insignia of the 7th BCA  is still a devil, in a hunting horn (representing the Chasseurs).

External links 
Les Zouaves et les Chasseurs a Pied, Duc d'Aumale, Henri d'Orléans - pseudonym - M. Lévy frères - 1859 - 184 pages
Sidi-Brahim - 23, 24, 25 et 26 septembre 1845, Esquisse Historique - Charleville - Imprimerie Nouvelle - 1889 - 58 pages

Notes 

Conflicts in 1845
Sidi Brahim
Sidi Brahim
French Algeria
1845 in Algeria
September 1845 events